Brian Maxwell Quigley (born 27 December 1935) is a former cricketer who played first-class cricket for South Australia from early in 1959 to late in 1960.

A pace bowler, Quigley took 27 wickets at an average of 30.96 in 1959-60, his only full season of first-class cricket. In the match against Queensland at the Adelaide Oval he took 7 for 39 in the first innings.

In the first match of the 1960-61 season he was no-balled for throwing by Col Egar, and never played first-class cricket again.

References

External links

1935 births
Living people
South Australia cricketers
Australian cricketers
Cricketers from Adelaide